The Mustafa cabinet was the cabinet of Kosovo led by Prime Minister Isa Mustafa between 9 December 2014 and 9 September 2017.

Composition
The cabinet consisted of the following Ministers:

References

Government ministers of Kosovo
Government of Kosovo
Cabinets established in 2014
Cabinets disestablished in 2017